Aneta Sablik (born 12 January 1989) is a Polish pop singer. She gained popularity in Europe after winning the eleventh season of Deutschland sucht den Superstar (DSDS; "Germany Seeks the Superstar") which was broadcast on RTL. Sablik was the first competitor to receive the highest number of points at every live show.

She was announced the winner of season 11 on 3 May 2014, winning €500,000, a car, and a record label contract.  She digitally launched her debut single "The One" on the same day of winning season 11, which topped music charts in Germany, Austria, Switzerland, and Luxembourg.

Sablik signed a contract with Polydor Records (owned by Universal Music Group) to release her debut album, titled The One in late 2014.

Discography

Albums

Singles

As lead artist

As featured artist 
 2016 – "Perfect Love" (Kevin David featuring Aneta Sablik)

Performances at DSDS season 11 
Sablik was the first competitor to receive the highest number of points at every Live Show.

References

External links 

RTL's Aneta Sablik page

1989 births
Living people
Polish pop singers
People from Bielsko-Biała
Polish expatriates in Germany
Universal Music Group artists
Deutschland sucht den Superstar winners
English-language singers from Poland
21st-century Polish women singers
21st-century Polish singers